Peter Balazs (born 11 December 1970 in Tulln an der Donau) is an Austrian mathematician working at the Acoustics Research Institute Vienna of the Austrian Academy of Sciences.

Peter Balazs studied mathematics and physics at the University of Vienna. In 2001, he graduated with honors in mathematics and an MSc thesis on "Polynomials over Groups" ("Polynome über Gruppen"). He successfully defended his PhD thesis and graduated (with distinction) in June 2005. His PhD thesis is titled, "Regular and Irregular Gabor Multiplier with Application to Psychoacoustic Masking".

Peter Balazs has been part of the Acoustics Research Institute since 1999. His PhD thesis was written at NuHaG (Numerical Harmonic Analysis Group), Faculty of Mathematics, University of Vienna. The cooperation formed during his thesis also resulted in him becoming a fellow of the HASSIP (Harmonic Analysis and Statistics for Signal and Image Processing) EU network. He joined the LATP (Laboratoire d'Analyse, Topologie, Probabilités), CMI and LMA, CNRS Marseille from November 2003 to April 2004 and in March, May and June 2006. He also worked with the FYMA, UCL, Louvain-La-Neuve in August 2005.

For the project FLAME (Frames and Linear Operators for Acoustical Modeling and Parameter Estimation) Peter Balazs 2011 was honored with the high reputed Start-Preis. He is director of the Acoustics Research Institute since 2012.

Selected publications

Peter Balazs has published 27 journal and 25 conference papers, a selection of which is presented below (in chronological order):

External links 
FLAME Projekt auf der Homepage des Institut für Schallforschung
Homepage der Österreichischen Akademie der Wissenschaften

Author profile in the database zbMATH

Quellen 

1970 births
Living people
21st-century Austrian mathematicians
Senior Members of the IEEE
University of Vienna alumni
People from Tulln an der Donau